Eulimnichus ater is a species of minute marsh-loving beetle in the family Limnichidae. It is found in the Caribbean Sea, Central America, North America, and South America.

References

Further reading

 
 

Byrrhoidea
Articles created by Qbugbot
Beetles described in 1854